The year 601 BC was a year of the pre-Julian Roman calendar. In the Roman Empire, it was known as year 153 Ab urbe condita. The denomination 601 BC for this year has been used since the early medieval period, when the Anno Domini calendar era became the prevalent method in Europe for naming years.

Events
Traditional date of the foundation of Perinthus by settlers from Samos.
The Jewish–Babylonian war begins between the Kingdom of Judah and Babylonia. It ends in 586 BC.

Births
Laozi, ancient Chinese philosopher and writer (traditional date)
Darius the Mede, sometimes identified as Gobryas or Cyaxeres II (Biblical date)

Deaths
Viscount Xuan of Zhao

References